Marían Navarro (born 27 May 1941) is a Spanish alpine skier. She competed in three events at the 1960 Winter Olympics.

References

1941 births
Living people
Spanish female alpine skiers
Olympic alpine skiers of Spain
Alpine skiers at the 1960 Winter Olympics
Place of birth missing (living people)